Line Hamel is a politician in Montreal, Quebec, Canada. She served on the Montreal city council from 2001 to 2009.

Education
Hamel has a Bachelor of Arts degree from the Université du Québec à Montréal (UQAM).

City councillor
Hamel first ran for city council in the 1998 municipal election as Vision Montreal's candidate for Saint-Pierre. She lost to longtime incumbent Germain Prégent of New Montreal.

Hamel ran again in the 2001 municipal election and was elected for the Louis-Cyr division. She was re-elected in the 2005 election in the renamed division of Saint-Henri–La Petite-Bourgogne–Pointe-Saint-Charles. Both elections were won by Gérald Tremblay's Montreal Island Citizens Union (MICU), and Hamel served as a member of the opposition. By virtue of serving on city council, Hamel was also a member of the Sud-Ouest borough council; in 2007, she supported a measure to permit bars and restaurants on Monk Street to construct frontal terraces.

In September 2007, Hamel's father, Michel Hamel, was charged with three counts of fraud pertaining to accusations that he had taken money from a local developer in return for seeking to obtain a zoning change. Line Hamel, who described herself as "in shock" at the charges, agreed to stand down from Vision Montreal's caucus and sit as an independent while the matter was before the courts.

Although she resigned from the Vision Montreal caucus in 2007, Hamel did not initially resign from the party itself; she took part in the launch of Vision Montreal's position paper on transit in June 2009. She was not permitted to run under Vision's banner in the 2009 municipal election, however, and instead ran for borough mayor of Le Sud-Ouest as an independent. She lost to Benoit Dorais, Vision's official candidate.

In January 2010, Michel Hamel pleaded guilty to fraud. A Montreal Gazette article reporting on the trial indicates that Line Hamel chaired a local urban planning advisory committee at the time of her father's illegal activity. Line Hamel was not herself accused of any improper activity.

Electoral record

References

Living people
Montreal city councillors
Women in Quebec politics
Women municipal councillors in Canada
Year of birth missing (living people)